Walnut Creek is a tributary stream of Animas Creek within Hidalgo County, New Mexico.

It lies south of Herridge Draw and Skeleton Canyon and north of Whitmire Canyon.

References

Rivers of Hidalgo County, New Mexico
Rivers of New Mexico